Linhe Subdistrict is a subdistrict in Tianhe District, Guangzhou, Guangdong, China. , it has 13 residential communities under its administration.

See also 
 List of township-level divisions of Guangdong

References

Township-level divisions of Guangdong
Tianhe District
Subdistricts of the People's Republic of China